Mirabello  may refer to:

Places
Greece
Mirabello Bay, a bay in Lasithi, Crete
Mirabello Province, a former province in Lasithi, Crete

Italy
Mirabello Castle
Mirabello, Emilia–Romagna, a frazione of the comune of Terre del Reno, in the Province of Ferrara
Mirabello Monferrato, a comune in the Province of Alessandria, Piedmont
Mirabello Sannitico, a comune in the Province of Campobasso, Molise
Mirabello, a frazione of the comune di Pavia: see Battle of Pavia and Mirabello Castle

People 
 Mirabello Cavalori (1520–1572) Italian painter
 Lisa Mirabello, American medical geneticist

See also
Mirabel
Mirabella
Mirabelle